The Anti Terrorism Court of Pakistan (ATC) was established in Pakistan, under Nawaz Sharif's government, to deal with terrorism cases.

1997 creation and subsequent amendments 
The court had been created by the 1997 Anti-Terrorist Act, amended on 24 October 1998 by the Anti-Terrorism (Amendment) Ordinance following the Supreme Court judgment (Merham Ali versus Federation of Pakistan, 1998) declaring most of its provisions unconstitutional. A short time before being ousted from power by Pervez Musharraf's coup, Sharif enacted the 25 August 1999 Pakistan Anti-Terrorism (Amendment) Ordinance which generalized the ATC system to all of the country.

Anti-terrorism courts under General Pervez Musharraf 
Following Pervez Musharraf's 1999 coup, Nawaz Sharif was judged and given a life sentence in 2000 by the ATC, which was commuted into exile.

ATC sentenced to death in 2006, Kamran Atif, an alleged member of Harkat-ul Mujahideen al-Alami who had attempted to assassinate Musharraf in 2002, and had been arrested two years later. Following Musharraf's resignation in 2008, a moratorium on capital punishment has been enacted, although it is not completely respected.

See also 
Anti-terrorism legislation#Pakistan
Human rights in Pakistan
Anti-Terrorism Act 1997

References

External links
Pakistan Anti-Terrorism (Amendment) Ordinance, 1999

Terrorism in Pakistan
Court system of Pakistan
Nawaz Sharif administration
Counterterrorism in Pakistan